Nässjö is a locality and the seat of Nässjö Municipality, Jönköping County, Sweden with 16,678 inhabitants in 2010.

History
For many years, Nässjö was a rural village with agriculture as the dominant occupation. The turning point was the construction of the Swedish railway system. The southern main line railway, finished in 1864, passed through Nässjö. Later, other railways were inaugurated, whereby Nässjö, due to its geographical location in the country, became an important junction. A line to Katrineholm was opened in 1874, and that year also the opening of the Oskarshamn line; the one to Halmstad in 1882; to Kalmar in 1914.  Today, Nässjö is the only Swedish junction where railways in six different directions meet.

As a result, industries moved to Nässjö, and the population increased. The most important industries were wood industries due to the forest covered Småland province area, at a time when it had become possible to factory manufacture the wooden chair (a.k.a. Windsor chair). Nässjö attempted to get a charter, which was granted in 1914, making it one of the now defunct Cities of Sweden. It is since 1971 instead the seat of the much larger Nässjö Municipality.

Its population continued to increase throughout the 20th century. In the 1940s production of electrical installation equipment began, and the industry Eldon AB was for a long time the largest industry of the town.

The rock band Backyard Babies and metal band Kongh hail from Nässjö. The head of the largest ponzi scheme in the Nordic countries, Winclub/Wincapita, Mr Hannu Kailajärvi was arrested in Nässjö on December 10, 2008, after reportedly having lived there for some time.

Geography

Image gallery

References 

 
Municipal seats of Jönköping County
Swedish municipal seats
Populated places in Jönköping County
Populated places in Nässjö Municipality